Netechma cordillerana is a species of moth of the family Tortricidae first described by Józef Razowski and Janusz Wojtusiak in 2006  It is endemic to Colombia.

The ground colour of the forewings is cream, sprinkled and suffused with brown. The markings are brown and the hindwings are greyish brown.

Etymology
The species name refers to the type locality, the Cordillera.

References

External links

Moths described in 2006
Endemic fauna of Colombia
Moths of South America
cordillerana